Etlingera amomoides is a monocotyledonous plant species described by Axel Dalberg Poulsen and John Donald Mood. Etlingera amomoides is part of the genus Etlingera and the family Zingiberaceae. No subspecies are listed in the Catalog of Life.

References 

amomoides